The Heart of the Warrior is a Star Trek: Deep Space Nine novel written by John Gregory Betancourt.

In Voyages of Imagination, Betancourt remarked, "Worf has always been one of my favorite characters, and I wanted to write a book about him but set in the Dominion, where he would find a challenge to his hand-to-hand combat skills. Unfortunately, later seasons of DS9 developed the Founders and Dominion enough that my book is, ah, retroactively contradictory to the official universe in a number of places. Which is too bad because I think it's my best Trek novel."

Plot 
A crucial peace conference fills Deep Space Nine with intrigue. At the same time, Kira and Worf take a mission into enemy territory to discover the secrets of the chemical that controls the highly dangerous Jem'Hadar warriors. Odo may be their only hope of survival but he'll have to fight against his own people.

References

External links 

 The Heart of the Warrior at Memory Beta
 

Novels based on Star Trek: Deep Space Nine
1996 American novels
American science fiction novels
Pocket Books books